Centerville is an unincorporated community in Elbert County, in the U.S. state of Georgia.

History
The community was so named on account of its relatively central location between Blakely and Mayhaw.

References

Unincorporated communities in Elbert County, Georgia
Unincorporated communities in Georgia (U.S. state)